Tune Hotels.com is a limited service hotel chain operated by Tune Hotels Management Sdn Bhd that provides a claimed "5-star sleeping experience at a 1-star price" accommodation. Tune Hotels is part of the Tune Group, the private investment group of Tan Sri Tony Fernandes, founder and group CEO of low-cost airline AirAsia.

Limited service
The limited service model used by Tune Hotels is similar to the no frills business model practised by low-cost carriers such as AirAsia and has been adapted to the hospitality industry. Similar concepts includes EasyHotel by easyJet.

Properties and locations
Tune Hotels have 10 locations in Malaysia and the United Kingdom.

See also 
 Red Planet Hotels

References

External links

Hotels in Malaysia
Hotel chains
Malaysian brands
Tune Group